Fahem Ouslati (born April 14, 1986 in Kouba, Algiers) is an Algerian footballer who is currently playing for Olympique Noisy-le-Sec in the Championnat de France amateur 2.

Club career
After a breakout season with CR Belouizdad in 2004/2005, he was involved in a transfer dispute between his club and JS Kabylie after signing a contract with both clubs. He was eventually declared a JS Kabylie player but was suspended for 6 months by the Algerian FA. He failed to make an impact with the team and signed with MO Béjaïa in 2007.

He has been capped for Algeria at the junior level, including playing at the 2005 Mediterranean Games in Almeria, Spain and the 2005 Islamic Solidarity Games in Jeddah, Saudi Arabia.

Honours
 Won the Algerian league once with JS Kabylie in 2006

External links
 DZFoot.com Profile

1986 births
Algeria youth international footballers
Algeria under-23 international footballers
Algerian footballers
Algerian expatriates in France
CR Belouizdad players
JS Kabylie players
Kabyle people
Living people
MC Saïda players
MO Constantine players
MO Béjaïa players
Olympique Noisy-le-Sec players
People from Kouba
Association football midfielders
21st-century Algerian people